Ford Fairlane may refer to:

Automobiles 
 Ford Fairlane (Americas), a car manufactured by the Ford Motor Company between 1955 and 1970
 Ford Fairlane (Australia), a car manufactured by the Ford Motor Company of Australia between 1959 and 2007
 Ford Fairlane 500 Skyliner, a car manufactured by the Ford Motor Company between 1957 and 1959

Movies
 The Adventures of Ford Fairlane, a 1990 movie starring Andrew Dice Clay, Priscilla Presley and Wayne Newton

See also 
 Fair Lane, Henry Ford's house and estate
 Fairlane Town Center